Sheila Orr (born 1949 or 1950) is a Canadian politician, who represented the electoral district of Victoria-Hillside in the Legislative Assembly of British Columbia from 2001 to 2005. She sat as a member of the BC Liberal Party.

Electoral record

References

External links
 Profile at the Legislative Assembly of British Columbia

British Columbia Liberal Party MLAs
Politicians from Victoria, British Columbia
Women MLAs in British Columbia
Living people
Candidates in the 2006 Canadian federal election
Liberal Party of Canada candidates for the Canadian House of Commons
21st-century Canadian women politicians
Year of birth uncertain
Year of birth missing (living people)